Øistein Kristiansen, formerly known under his artist name Einstein Kristiansen (born 12 September 1965), is a Norwegian cartoonist, designer, TV-host and co-founder of Singapore-based Earthtree Pte Ltd, who together with his two business partners Henry Steed and Mark Hillman, produces children's television programming, animation and image campaigns for MTV Asia, Nickelodeon and Singapore network Mediacorp TV12 (present-day Okto channel).

Born in Sarpsborg, Norway, Kristiansen grew up in Greåker, a borough of Sarpsborg. He initially rose to fame for his illustration work in magazines like Vogue, ELLE, and Mad Magazine after studying cartooning in New York City. A keen traveller, Kristiansen was backpacking through Southeast Asia with the intention of travelling on to find work in Japan. Finding himself stranded in Singapore and short of money, he was reduced to drawing cartoons for tourists in Clarke Quay. He found there was a demand for his quirky, childlike vision of the world, and soon enjoyed some celebrity as a cartoonist for the Singapore newspaper, The Straits Times.

His television career in Singapore began in the mid-1990s as an extra for Mediacorp drama productions, but he was not taken seriously in the local market until the year 2000, when Perth-based CVA Productions began production of the children's arts and crafts comedy show Art Factory for three seasons.

Subsequently, Kristiansen, together with Art Factory director Mark Hillman, co-produced a new show for MediaCorp. Cows n Crayons, Earthtree's first successful show, ran for two seasons. It was followed by Super Einstein, a superhero-themed art show, which ran for two seasons, and "Einstein's Tingkat", a cooking and arts show.

In 2005, Kristiansen appeared in a self-funded series of live action shorts called "Right on Top". The series was transmitted on the Nickelodeon Southeast Asia feed. One season of "Art Mad", the show's long form, has been purchased for broadcast by German corporation Faber-Castell for transmission in Indonesia.

In 2011, Kristiansen started a YouTube channel named "Box Yourself". On the channel he posts tutorials on how to create various items with cardboard. The channel was started in 2011, but he did not post until 2014. The channel has since gained 783000 subscribers (as of November 19, 2021). In the channel description, Kristiansen describes the channel like this, "Think it, Make it! Box Yourself inspires kids all over the world to see themselves as designers, creators and makers. We make design easy, engaging and fun."

He published a book entitled "Draw Robots with Øistein Kristiansen: Get The World To Draw! (Learn To Draw)" in March 2014.

TV programs 
 Art Factory
 Cows n Crayons
 Super Einstein
 Einstein's Tingkat
 Right On Top
 Art Mad
 Wild About Cartoons
 Christmas with Øistein
 That's Imagination (2009)
 Learn to Draw (2012)
 Box Yourself (2013)
 Box Yourself Minis (2015-2016)
 Learn to Draw Minis (2014-2016)
 Doodle (2015)
 Box Ideas (2017)

Legal controversies regarding Kristiansen
Kristiansen's company, Earthtree Pte Ltd, was originally known as Einstein's Earthtree Pte Ltd. However, lawyers from The Roger Richman Agency, on behalf of The Hebrew University of Jerusalem, issued warning letters to protect the image and identity of Albert Einstein. The lawyers also contested his use of the moniker "Einstein Kristiansen", and so in 2007, he changed his professional name back to his original name, Øistein Kristiansen.

References

External links
Oeistein Kristiansen Official Artist Website

Norwegian cartoonists
Norwegian expatriates in Singapore
Norwegian television personalities
Living people
1965 births
People from Sarpsborg
Norwegian YouTubers